Apamea plutonia, the dusky Quaker or dusky apamea, is a moth of the family Noctuidae. The species was first described by Augustus Radcliffe Grote in 1883. It is native to northern North America, where it occurs across the boreal regions, with some occurrences from as far south as New Mexico and Pennsylvania.

The forewing length is 16 to 17 millimeters, and the wings are very dark brown, nearly black.

The cutworm larva feeds on grasses.

References

External links

"Apamea plutonia (Grote, 1883)". The Lepidoptera of Wayne County, Ohio. Retrieved November 15, 2020.

Apamea (moth)
Moths of North America
Moths described in 1883
Taxa named by Augustus Radcliffe Grote